Hizan District is a district of Bitlis Province of Turkey. Its seat is the town of Hizan. Its area is 1,021 km2, and its population is 32,586 (2021).

Composition
There is one municipality in Hizan District:
 Hizan

There are 76 villages in Hizan District:

 Ağılözü
 Akbıyık
 Akça
 Akçevre
 Akdik
 Akşar
 Aladana
 Ballı
 Ballıca
 Bozpınar
 Bölüklü
 Budaklı
 Çalışkanlar
 Çatakdeğirmen
 Çayır
 Çökekyazı
 Dağören
 Dayılar
 Derince
 Doğancı
 Döküktaş
 Ekinli
 Ekintepe
 Elmacık
 Erencik
 Esenler
 Gayda
 Gökay
 Göktepe
 Gönüllü
 Güngören
 Gürece
 Hacımehmet
 Harmandöven
 Horozdere
 İçlikaval
 İncirli
 Kalkanlı
 Kapısuyu
 Karaağaç
 Karbastı
 Karlıtepe
 Kayadeler
 Kayalı
 Kaymaklı
 Keçeli
 Keklik
 Koçlu
 Koçyiğit
 Kolludere
 Koyunlu
 Meydan
 Nuh
 Nurs
 Oğlaklı
 Örgülü
 Ortaca
 Oymapınar
 Sağınlı
 Sağırkaya
 Sarıtaş
 Sarpkaya
 Soğuksu
 Sürücüler
 Süttaşı
 Tutumlu
 Uzuntaş
 Ürünveren
 Yaylacık
 Yelkıran
 Yenicik
 Yığınkaya
 Yoğurtlu
 Yolbilen
 Yukarıayvacık
 Yukarıçalı

References

Districts of Bitlis Province